The Hufen-Oberlyzeum was a girls' gymnasium in Königsberg, Germany.

History 

Elvira Szittnick founded a girls' secondary school on Bahnstraße, later Hindenburgstraße, in Mittelhufen in 1902. Three years later it moved to a new building on the same street. It was acquired by the Prussian state and converted into a gymnasium in 1921, taking on the tradition of the former Königliche Luisenschule of Posen (Poznań). Alfred Walsdorff was its only director. It closed in January 1945 during World War II. The building is now used as a school in Kaliningrad, Russia. Amongst its better known pupils was Hannah Arendt, who enrolled there in August 1913.

Notes

References

1902 establishments in Germany
1945 disestablishments in Germany
Buildings and structures in Kaliningrad
Education in Königsberg
Educational institutions established in 1902
Educational institutions disestablished in 1945
Former buildings and structures in Königsberg
Girls' schools in Germany
Gymnasiums in Germany